Volcano (formerly Soldier's Gulch and The Volcano) is a census-designated place in Amador County, California. It lies at an elevation of 2070 feet (631 m). The population was 115 at the 2010 census. The town is registered as a California Historical Landmark. The community is in ZIP code 95689 and area code 209.

History

The town is named for its setting in a bowl-shaped valley which early gold miners thought was caused by a volcano. Early morning fog rising from the valley floor only reinforced that belief. The area was first designated by Colonel Stevenson's men, who mined Soldiers Gulch in 1849. In 1851 a post office was established and by April 1852 there were 300 houses. By 1853 the flats and gulches swarmed with men, and there were 11 stores, six hotels, three bakeries, and three saloons. Hydraulic mining operations, begun in 1855, brought thousands of fortune seekers to form a town of 17 hotels, a library, a theater, and courts of quick justice.

During the Civil War, Volcano's gold served the Union. The "Volcano Blues" smuggled the 800 lb cannon "Old Abe," into the town by hearse, to intimidate rebel sympathizers. The cannon was cast by Cyrus Alger & Co. in Boston in 1837 and is the first of two 6-pounders made on the same day to be stamped with serial number 4. The other cannon still survives at Shiloh Battlefield and is called "Shiloh Sam". "Old Abe" was only fired once during the Civil War. The Confederate faction known as Knights of the Golden Circle owned many of the Main Street businesses. "Old Abe" was fired down Main Street causing windows to break in all the shops that had not been warned – the ones sympathetic to the South.  Abe is the only cannon of that age in the U.S. still on a nineteenth century wooden carriage.

The landmark St. George Hotel is listed on the National Register of Historic Places.

Volcano almost became the county seat in 1854 and again in 1857, but the newspaper closed in 1857 and afterwards, the town began to decline.

Although small, Volcano is a town of many "firsts":
 1854 First theater group in California
 1854 First debating society in California
 1854 First circulating library in California
 1855 First private schools in California
 1855 First private law school in California
 1856 First legal hanging in Amador County
 1860 First astronomical observatory in California
 1978 First solar still in California

Tourist attractions

Volcano has a number of Gold Rush-era buildings with signs indicating their historic significance. A post office opened in Volcano in 1851. Volcano boasts one of the longest-running general stores in California, having been in continuous use since 1852. The Union Billiard Saloon and Boarding House opened in 1880 and was also the site of the Volcano Justice Court, presided over by Judge Peter Jonas. In 1862, B.F. George built the St. George Hotel on the previous footprint of the Eureka Hotel, which burned down in 1853, and the Empire Hotel, which burned down in 1859. George Madeira established California's first recorded astronomical observatory in 1860 which is where the Great Comet of 1861 was discovered (in the U.S.). It is registered as a California Historical Landmark.

Volcano is also home to Black Chasm Cave, a National Natural Landmark.

The Volcano Theater Company was founded in 1974. The company conducts a full season each year, performing in both the 1856  Cobblestone Theater and in the larger outdoor Volcano Amphitheater.

Daffodil Hill is a public garden open each spring to the public at no cost for admission. Daffodils were first planted in the mid-19th century by landowner Pete Denzer to remind him of Holland, his home country.  In 1877, Arthur McLaughlin and his wife, “Lizzie” van Vorst-McLaughlin bought the property, which is still owned and managed by their descendants. Approximately 300,000 flowers are in bloom during the Spring.

Notable people
James T. Farley, United States Senator for California (1879–1885)
Harry B. Liversedge (1894-1951) - born in Volcano, California. He is a two-time track star at both the 1920 and 1924 Olympics and later Brigadier General best known as the leader of the regiment figured in the historic Iwo Jima flag raising.
Angelo Joseph Rossi, 31st Mayor of San Francisco (1931–1944).

Demographics
The 2010 United States Census reported that Volcano had a population of 115. The racial makeup of Volcano was 109 (94.8%) White, 0 (0.0%) African American, 2 (1.7%) American Indian or Alaska Native, 2 (1.7%) Asian, 0 (0.0%) Native Hawaiian or Pacific Islander, 0 (0.0%) from other races, and 2 (1.7%) from two or more races. Hispanic or Latino of any race were 7 persons (6.1%).

The Census reported that 115 people (100% of the population) lived in households, 0 (0%) lived in non-institutionalized group quarters, and 0 (0%) were institutionalized.

There were 55 households, out of which 10 (18.2%) had children under the age of 18 living in them, 23 (41.8%) were opposite-sex married couples living together, 5 (9.1%) had a female householder with no husband present, 5 (9.1%) had a male householder with no wife present.  There were 3 (5.5%) unmarried opposite-sex partnerships, and 1 (1.8%) same-sex married couples or partnerships. 18 households (32.7%) were made up of individuals, and 4 (7.3%) had someone living alone who was 65 years of age or older. The average household size was 2.09.  There were 33 families (60.0% of all households); the average family size was 2.52.

The population was spread out, with 20 people (17.4%) under the age of 18, 3 people (2.6%) aged 18 to 24, 11 people (9.6%) aged 25 to 44, 53 people (46.1%) aged 45 to 64, and 28 people (24.3%) who were 65 years of age or older.  The median age was 57.1 years. For every 100 females, there were 98.3 males.  For every 100 females age 18 and over, there were 93.9 males.

The homeowner vacancy rate was 0%; the rental vacancy rate was 14.3%.  83 people (72.2% of the population) lived in owner-occupied housing units and 32 people (27.8%) lived in rental housing units.

Government

Appearances in popular culture
Volcano was featured by Huell Howser in Road Trip Episode 127.

A 10-minute scene on The Big Valley TV show is set in Volcano.  Mrs. Barkley is arrested for rustling there.

References

Census-designated places in Amador County, California
California Historical Landmarks
Census-designated places in California
1849 establishments in California
Populated places established in 1849